Mary Webster may refer to:

 Mary Webster (alleged witch), accused of witchcraft in the 1680s in Puritan Hadley, Massachusetts
 Mary Webster (British actress) (1935–2014), British actress
 Mary Webster (American actress) (1935–2017), American actress
 Mary Morison Webster (1894–1980), Scottish-born novelist and poet
 Mary Hortense Webster (1881–1965), sculptor
 Mary McCallum Webster (1906–1985), British botanist
 Mary Clark Webster, member of the Maine House of Representatives